The following outline is provided as an overview of and topical guide to formal science:

Formal science – branches of knowledge that are concerned with formal systems, such as those under the branches of: logic, mathematics, computer science, statistics, and some aspects of linguistics. Unlike other sciences, the formal sciences are not concerned with the validity of theories based on observations in the real world, but instead with the properties of formal systems based on definitions and rules.

Branches of formal science

Logic

Mathematics 

 Mathematics – search for fundamental truths in pattern, quantity, and change. (See also AMS Mathematics Subject Classification)
 Algebra – one of the main branches of mathematics, it concerns the study of structure, relation and quantity.
 Abstract algebra - the study of algebraic structures
 Group theory – studies the algebraic structures known as groups.
 Group representation – describe abstract groups in terms of linear transformations of vector spaces
 Field theory – branch of mathematics which studies the properties of fields
 Ring theory – study of ring–algebraic structures in which addition and multiplication are defined and have similar properties to those familiar from the integers
 Associative algebra – associative ring that has a compatible structure of a vector space over a certain field K or, more generally, of a module over a commutative ring R
 Non-associative algebra – K-vector space (or more generally a module) A equipped with a K-bilinear map
 Commutative algebra - the branch of algebra that studies commutative rings, their ideals, and modules over such rings
 Ideal theory - the theory of ideals in commutative rings
 Non-commutative algebra - the part of ring theory devoted to study of properties of the noncommutative rings, including the properties that apply also to commutative rings
 Wheel theory – studies the algebraic structures known as wheels.
 Universal algebra – field of mathematics that studies algebraic structures themselves, not examples ("models") of algebraic structures
 Linear algebra – branch of mathematics concerning finite or countably infinite dimensional vector spaces, as well as linear mappings between such spaces.
 Vector space – mathematical structure formed by a collection of vectors: objects that may be added together and multiplied ("scaled") by numbers, called scalars in this context.
 Multilinear algebra – extends the methods of linear algebra
 Lie algebra – algebraic structure whose main use is in studying geometric objects such as Lie groups and differentiable manifolds
 Homological algebra – branch of mathematics which studies homology in a general algebraic setting
 Category theory – area of study in mathematics that examines in an abstract way the properties of particular mathematical concepts, by formalising them as collections of objects and arrows (also called morphisms, although this term also has a specific, non-category-theoretical sense), where these collections satisfy some basic conditions
 Lattice theory – partially ordered set in which any two elements have a unique supremum (also called a least upper bound or join) and a unique infimum (also called a greatest lower bound or meet).
 Order theory – branch of mathematics which investigates our intuitive notion of order using binary relations.
 Differential algebra – algebras equipped with a derivation, which is a unary function that is linear and satisfies the Leibniz product rule.
 Analysis – branch of pure mathematics that includes the theories of differentiation, integration and measure, limits, infinite series, and analytic functions
 Real analysis – branch of mathematical analysis dealing with the set of real numbers and functions of a real variable.
 Calculus – branch of mathematics focused on limits, functions, derivatives, integrals, and infinite series.
 Complex analysis – branch of mathematical analysis that investigates functions of complex numbers
 Functional analysis – branch of mathematical analysis, the core of which is formed by the study of vector spaces endowed with some kind of limit-related structure (e.g. inner product, norm, topology, etc.) and the linear operators acting upon these spaces and respecting these structures in a suitable sense
 Operator theory – branch of functional analysis that focuses on bounded linear operators, but which includes closed operators and nonlinear operators.
 Non-standard analysis – branch of classical mathematics that formulates analysis using a rigorous notion of an infinitesimal number.
 Harmonic analysis – branch of mathematics concerned with the representation of functions or signals as the superposition of basic waves, and the study of and generalization of the notions of Fourier series and Fourier transforms.
 p-adic analysis – branch of number theory that deals with the mathematical analysis of functions of p-adic numbers.
 Ordinary differential equations – ordinary differential equation (ODE) is an equation in which there is only one independent variable and one or more derivatives of a dependent variable with respect to the independent variable, so that all the derivatives occurring in the equation are ordinary derivatives.
 Partial differential equations – differential equation that contains unknown multivariable functions and their partial derivatives.
 Probability theory – branch of mathematics concerned with probability, the analysis of random phenomena.
 Measure theory – systematic way to assign a number to each suitable subset of that set, intuitively interpreted as its size.
 Ergodic theory – branch of mathematics that studies dynamical systems with an invariant measure and related problems.
 Stochastic process – collection of random variables; this is often used to represent the evolution of some random value, or system, over time.
 Geometry – branch of mathematics concerned with questions of shape, size, relative position of figures, and the properties of space. Geometry is one of the oldest mathematical sciences.
 Topology – major area of mathematics concerned with properties that are preserved under continuous deformations of objects, such as deformations that involve stretching, but no tearing or gluing.
 General topology – branch of topology which studies properties of topological spaces and structures defined on them.
 Algebraic topology – branch of mathematics which uses tools from abstract algebra to study topological spaces
 Geometric topology – study of manifolds and maps between them, particularly embeddings of one manifold into another.
 Differential topology – field dealing with differentiable functions on differentiable manifolds
 Algebraic geometry – branch of mathematics which combines techniques of abstract algebra, especially commutative algebra, with the language and the problems of geometry
 Differential geometry – mathematical discipline that uses the techniques of differential calculus and integral calculus, as well as linear algebra and multilinear algebra, to study problems in geometry
 Projective geometry – study of geometric properties that are invariant under projective transformations
 Affine geometry – study of geometric properties which remain unchanged by affine transformations
 Non-Euclidean geometry – either of two specific geometries that are, loosely speaking, obtained by negating the Euclidean parallel postulate, namely hyperbolic and elliptic geometry.
 Convex geometry – branch of geometry studying convex sets, mainly in Euclidean space.
 Discrete geometry – branch of geometry that studies combinatorial properties and constructive methods of discrete geometric objects.
 Trigonometry – branch of mathematics that studies relationships involving lengths and angles of triangles
 Number theory – branch of pure mathematics devoted primarily to the study of the integers
 Analytic number theory – branch of number theory that uses methods from mathematical analysis to solve problems about the integers
 Algebraic number theory – major branch of number theory which studies algebraic structures related to algebraic integers
 Geometric number theory – studies convex bodies and integer vectors in n-dimensional space
 Logic and Foundations of mathematics – subfield of mathematics with close connections to the foundations of mathematics, theoretical computer science and philosophical logic.
 Set theory – branch of mathematics that studies sets, which are collections of objects
 Proof theory – branch of mathematical logic that represents proofs as formal mathematical objects, facilitating their analysis by mathematical techniques
 Model theory – study of (classes of) mathematical structures (e.g. groups, fields, graphs, universes of set theory) using tools from mathematical logic
 Recursion theory – branch of mathematical logic and computer science that originated in the 1930s with the study of computable functions and Turing degrees
 Modal logic – type of formal logic primarily developed in the 1960s that extends classical propositional and predicate logic to include operators expressing modality
 Intuitionistic logic – symbolic logic system differing from classical logic in its definition of the meaning of a statement being true
 Applied mathematics – branch of mathematics that concerns itself with mathematical methods that are typically used in science, engineering, business, and industry.
 Mathematical statistics – study of statistics from a mathematical standpoint, using probability theory as well as other branches of mathematics such as linear algebra and analysis
 Probability – likelihood or chance that something is the case or will happen
 Econometrics – application of mathematics and statistical methods to economic data
 Actuarial science – discipline that applies mathematical and statistical methods to assess risk in the insurance and finance industries.
 Demography – statistical study of human populations and sub-populations.
 Approximation theory – study of how functions can best be approximated with simpler functions, and with quantitatively characterizing the errors introduced thereby.
 Numerical analysis – study of algorithms that use numerical approximation (as opposed to general symbolic manipulations) for the problems of mathematical analysis (as distinguished from discrete mathematics).
 Optimization (Mathematical programming) – selection of a best element from some set of available alternatives.
 Operations research – study of the application of advanced analytical methods to help make better decisions
Linear programming – mathematical method for determining a way to achieve the best outcome (such as maximum profit or lowest cost) in a given mathematical model for some list of requirements represented as linear relationships
 Dynamical systems – concept in mathematics where a fixed rule describes the time dependence of a point in a geometrical space
 Chaos theory – study of the behavior of dynamical systems that are highly sensitive to initial conditions, an effect which is popularly referred to as the butterfly effect.
 Fractal geometry – mathematical set that has a fractal dimension that usually exceeds its topological dimension and may fall between the integers.
 Mathematical physics – development of mathematical methods for application to problems in physics
 Quantum field theory – theoretical framework for constructing quantum mechanical models of systems classically parametrized (represented) by an infinite number of degrees of freedom, that is, fields and (in a condensed matter context) many-body systems.
 Statistical mechanics – branch of physics that applies probability theory, which contains mathematical tools for dealing with large populations, to the study of the thermodynamic behavior of systems composed of a large number of particles.
 Information theory – branch of applied mathematics and electrical engineering involving the quantification of information.
 Cryptography – study of means of obscuring information, such as codes and ciphers
 Combinatorics – branch of mathematics concerning the study of finite or countable discrete structures
 Coding theory – study of the properties of codes and their fitness for a specific application
 Graph theory – study of graphs, mathematical structures used to model pairwise relations between objects from a certain collection
 Game theory – study of strategic decision making. More formally, it is "the study of mathematical models of conflict and cooperation between intelligent rational decision-makers."

Statistics 

 Statistics – collection, analysis, interpretation, and presentation of data.
 Computational statistics – interface between statistics and computer science.
 Data mining – process that results in the discovery of new patterns in large data sets
 Regression – estimates the conditional expectation of the dependent variable given the independent variables – that is, the average value of the dependent variable when the independent variables are held fixed.
 Simulation – Simulation is the imitation of the operation of a real-world process or system over time. The act of simulating something first requires that a model be developed; this model represents the key characteristics or behaviors of the selected physical or abstract system or process. The model represents the system itself, whereas the simulation represents the operation of the system over time.
 Bootstrap (statistics) – method for assigning measures of accuracy to sample estimates (Efron and Tibshirani 1993).
 Design of experiments – design of any information-gathering exercises where variation is present, whether under the full control of the experimenter or not
 Block design – set together with a family of subsets (repeated subsets are allowed at times) whose members are chosen to satisfy some set of properties that are deemed useful for a particular application.
 Analysis of variance – collection of statistical models, and their associated procedures, in which the observed variance in a particular variable is partitioned into components attributable to different sources of variation.
 Response surface methodology – explores the relationships between several explanatory variables and one or more response variables.
 Engineering statistics – Engineering statistics combines engineering and statistics
 Spatial statistics – any of the formal techniques which study entities using their topological, geometric, or geographic properties.
 Social statistics – use of statistical measurement systems to study human behavior in a social environment
 Statistical modelling – formalization of relationships between variables in the form of mathematical equations
 Biostatistics – application of statistics to a wide range of topics in biology.
 Epidemiology – study of the distribution and patterns of health-events, health-characteristics and their causes or influences in well-defined populations.
 Multivariate analysis – observation and analysis of more than one statistical variable at a time.
 Structural equation model – statistical technique for testing and estimating causal relations using a combination of statistical data and qualitative causal assumptions.
Time series – sequence of data points, measured typically at successive time instants spaced at uniform time intervals.
 Reliability theory – describes the probability of a system completing its expected function during an interval of time.
 Quality control – process by which entities review the quality of all factors involved in production.
 Statistical theory – provides a basis for the whole range of techniques, in both study design and data analysis, that are used within applications of statistics.
 Decision theory – identifies the values, uncertainties and other issues relevant in a given decision, its rationality, and the resulting optimal decision.
 Mathematical statistics – study of statistics from a mathematical standpoint, using probability theory as well as other branches of mathematics such as linear algebra and analysis.
 Probability – likelihood or chance that something is the case or will happen.
 Sample Survey – process of selecting a sample of elements from a target population in order to conduct a survey.
 Sampling theory – study of the collection, organization, analysis, and interpretation of data.

 Survey methodology – field that studies the sampling of individuals from a population with a view towards making statistical inferences about the population using the sample.

Systems science 
 Systems science – interdisciplinary field of science that studies the nature of complex systems in nature, society, and science.
 Chaos theory – field of study in mathematics, with applications in several disciplines including physics, engineering, economics, biology, and philosophy; studies the behavior of dynamical systems that are highly sensitive to initial conditions.
 Complex systems and Complexity Theory – studies how relationships between parts give rise to the collective behaviors of a system and how the system interacts and forms relationships with its environment.
 Cybernetics – interdisciplinary study of the structure of regulatory systems.
 Biocybernetics – application of cybernetics to biological science, composed of biological disciplines that benefit from the application of cybernetics: neurology, multicellular systems and others.
 Engineering cybernetics – field of cybernetics, which deals with the question of control engineering of mechatronic systems as well as chemical or biological systems.
 Management cybernetics – field of cybernetics concerned with management and organizations.
 Medical cybernetics – branch of cybernetics which has been heavily affected by the development of the computer, which applies the concepts of cybernetics to medical research and practice.
 New Cybernetics – study of self-organizing systems according to Peter Harries-Jones (1988), "looking beyond the issues of the "first", "old" or "original" cybernetics and their politics and sciences of control, to the autonomy and self-organization capabilities of complex systems".
 Second-order cybernetics – investigates the construction of models of cybernetic systems.
 Control theory – Control theory is an interdisciplinary branch of engineering and mathematics that deals with the behavior of dynamical systems. The external input of a system is called the reference. When one or more output variables of a system need to follow a certain reference over time, a controller manipulates the inputs to a system to obtain the desired effect on the output of the system.
 Control engineering – engineering discipline that applies control theory to design systems with desired behaviors.
 Control systems – device, or set of devices to manage, command, direct or regulate the behavior of other devices or system.
 Dynamical systems – concept in mathematics where a fixed rule describes the time dependence of a point in a geometrical space.
 Operations research – study of the use of advanced analytical methods to help make better decisions.
 Systems dynamics – approach to understanding the behaviour of complex systems over time.
 Systems analysis – study of sets of interacting entities, including computer systems analysis.
 Systems theory – interdisciplinary study of systems in general, with the goal of elucidating principles that can be applied to all types of systems at all nesting levels in all fields of research.
 Developmental systems theory – overarching theoretical perspective on biological development, heredity, and evolution
 General systems theory – interdisciplinary study of systems in general, with the goal of elucidating principles that can be applied to all types of systems at all nesting levels in all fields of research.
 Linear time-invariant systems – investigates the response of a linear and time-invariant system to an arbitrary input signal.
 Mathematical system theory – area of mathematics used to describe the behavior of complex dynamical systems, usually by employing differential equations or difference equations.
 Systems biology – several related trends in bioscience research, and a movement that draws on those trends.
 Systems ecology – interdisciplinary field of ecology, taking a holistic approach to the study of ecological systems, especially ecosystems.
 Systems engineering – interdisciplinary field of engineering focusing on how complex engineering projects should be designed and managed over their life cycles.
 Systems neuroscience – subdiscipline of neuroscience and systems biology that studies the function of neural circuits and systems.
 Systems psychology – branch of applied psychology that studies human behaviour and experience in complex systems.

Computer science 

 Computer science – study of the theoretical foundations of information and computation and their implementation and application in computer systems. (See also Branches of Computer Science and ACM Computing Classification System)
 Theory of computation – branch that deals with whether and how efficiently problems can be solved on a model of computation, using an algorithm
 Automata theory – study of mathematical objects called abstract machines or automata and the computational problems that can be solved using them.
Formal languages – set of strings of symbols.
 Computability theory – branch of mathematical logic and computer science that originated in the 1930s with the study of computable functions and Turing degrees.
 Computational complexity theory – branch of the theory of computation in theoretical computer science and mathematics that focuses on classifying computational problems according to their inherent difficulty, and relating those classes to each other
 Concurrency theory – In computer science, concurrency is a property of systems in which several computations are executing simultaneously, and potentially interacting with each other
 Algorithms – step-by-step procedure for calculations
 Randomized algorithms – algorithm which employs a degree of randomness as part of its logic.
 Distributed algorithms – algorithm designed to run on computer hardware constructed from interconnected processors
 Parallel algorithms – algorithm which can be executed a piece at a time on many different processing devices, and then put back together again at the end to get the correct result.
 Data structures – particular way of storing and organizing data in a computer so that it can be used efficiently.
 Computer architecture – In computer science and engineering, computer architecture is the practical art of selecting and interconnecting hardware components to create computers that meet functional, performance and cost goals and the formal modeling of those systems.
 VLSI design – process of creating integrated circuits by combining thousands of transistors into a single chip
 Operating systems – set of software that manages computer hardware resources and provides common services for computer programs
 Computer communications (networks) – collection of hardware components and computers interconnected by communication channels that allow sharing of resources and information
 Information theory – branch of applied mathematics and electrical engineering involving the quantification of information
 Internet – global system of interconnected computer networks that use the standard Internet protocol suite (often called TCP/IP, although not all applications use TCP) to serve billions of users worldwide.
 World Wide Web – part of the Internet; system of interlinked hypertext documents accessed via the Internet.
 Wireless computing  – any type of computer network that is not connected by cables of any kind.
 Mobile computing – form of human–computer interaction by which a computer is expected to be transported during normal usage.
 Computer security – branch of computer technology known as information security as applied to computers and networks.
 reliability – system design approach and associated service implementation that ensures a prearranged level of operational performance will be met during a contractual measurement period.
 Cryptography – practice and study of hiding information.
 Fault-tolerant computing – property that enables a system (often computer-based) to continue operating properly in the event of the failure of (or one or more faults within) some of its components
 Distributed computing – field of computer science that studies distributed systems
 Grid computing – federation of computer resources from multiple administrative domains to reach a common goal
 Parallel computing – form of computation in which many calculations are carried out simultaneously, operating on the principle that large problems can often be divided into smaller ones, which are then solved concurrently ("in parallel").
 High-performance computing – computer at the frontline of current processing capacity, particularly speed of calculation
 Quantum computing – device for computation that makes direct use of quantum mechanical phenomena, such as superposition and entanglement, to perform operations on data
 Computer graphics – graphics created using computers and, more generally, the representation and manipulation of image data by a computer with help from specialized software and hardware.
 Image processing – any form of signal processing for which the input is an image, such as a photograph or video frame; the output of image processing may be either an image or a set of characteristics or parameters related to the image
 Scientific visualization – interdisciplinary branch of science according to Friendly (2008) "primarily concerned with the visualization of three-dimensional phenomena (architectural, meteorological, medical, biological, etc.), where the emphasis is on realistic renderings of volumes, surfaces, illumination sources, and so forth, perhaps with a dynamic (time) component".
 Computational geometry – branch of computer science devoted to the study of algorithms which can be stated in terms of geometry
 Software engineering – application of a systematic, disciplined, quantifiable approach to the development, operation, and maintenance of software; that is the application of engineering to software
 Formal methods – particular kind of mathematically based techniques for the specification, development and verification of software and hardware systems
Formal verification – act of proving or disproving the correctness of intended algorithms underlying a system with respect to a certain formal specification or property, using formal methods of mathematics
 Programming language theory – study of the design and implementation of formal languages known as programming languages which are used to communicate instructions to a machine, particularly a computer
 Programming paradigms – fundamental style of computer programming
 Object-oriented programming – programming paradigm using "objects" – data structures consisting of data fields and methods together with their interactions – to design applications and computer programs
 Functional programming – programming paradigm that treats computation as the evaluation of mathematical functions and avoids state and mutable data
 Program semantics – field concerned with the rigorous mathematical study of the meaning of programming languages
 Type theory – any of several formal systems that can serve as alternatives to naive set theory, or the study of such formalisms in general
 Compilers – computer program (or set of programs) that transforms source code written in a programming language (the source language) into another computer language (the target language, often having a binary form known as object code)
 Concurrent programming languages – form of computing in which programs are designed as collections of interacting computational processes that may be executed in parallel
 Information science – interdisciplinary field primarily concerned with the analysis, collection, classification, manipulation, storage, retrieval and dissemination of information
 Database – organized collection of data, today typically in digital form
 Relational database – collection of data items organized as a set of formally described tables from which data can be accessed easily
 Distributed database – database in which storage devices are not all attached to a common CPU.
 Object database – database management system in which information is represented in the form of objects as used in object-oriented programming
 Multimedia – media and content that uses a combination of different content forms.
 hypermedia – computer-based information retrieval system that enables a user to gain or provide access to texts, audio and video recordings, photographs and computer graphics related to a particular subject.
 Data mining – process that results in the discovery of new patterns in large data sets
 Information retrieval – area of study concerned with searching for documents, for information within documents, and for metadata about documents, as well as that of searching structured storage, relational databases, and the World Wide Web.
 Artificial intelligence – branch of computer science that deals with intelligent behavior, learning, and adaptation in machines.
 Automated reasoning – field dedicated to giving machines the ability to imitate the cognitive process of reasoning.
 Automated theorem proving - branch of automated reasoning concerned with proving mathematical theorems
 Computer vision – field that includes methods for acquiring, processing, analysing, and understanding images and, in general, high-dimensional data from the real world in order to produce numerical or symbolic information, e.g., in the forms of decisions.
 Machine learning – scientific discipline concerned with the design and development of algorithms that allow computers to evolve behaviors based on empirical data, such as from sensor data or databases
 Artificial neural network – mathematical model or computational model that is inspired by the structure and/or functional aspects of biological neural networks
 Natural language processing – field of computer science, artificial intelligence (also called machine learning), and linguistics concerned with the interactions between computers and human (natural) languages.
 Computational linguistics – interdisciplinary field dealing with the statistical or rule-based modeling of natural language from a computational perspective.
 Expert systems – computer system that emulates the decision-making ability of a human expert
 Robotics – branch of technology that deals with the design, construction, operation, structural disposition, manufacture and application of robots
 Human-computer interaction – study, planning, and design of the interaction between people (users) and computers.
 Numerical analysis – study of algorithms that use numerical approximation (as opposed to general symbolic manipulations) for the problems of mathematical analysis (as distinguished from discrete mathematics).
 Algebraic (symbolic) computation – relates to algorithms and software for manipulating mathematical expressions and equations in symbolic form, as opposed to manipulating the approximations of specific numerical quantities represented by those symbols. Software applications that perform symbolic calculations are called computer algebra systems.
 Computational number theory – study of algorithms for performing number theoretic computations
 Computational mathematics – involves mathematical research in areas of science where computing plays a central and essential role, emphasizing algorithms, numerical methods, and symbolic methods
 Scientific computing (Computational science) –
 Computational biology (bioinformatics) – involves the development and application of data-analytical and theoretical methods, mathematical modeling and computational simulation techniques to the study of biological, behavioral, and social systems.
 Computational science – subfield of computer science concerned with constructing mathematical models and quantitative analysis techniques and using computers to analyze and solve scientific problems
 Computational chemistry – branch of chemistry that uses principles of computer science to assist in solving chemical problems
 Computational neuroscience – study of brain function in terms of the information processing properties of the structures that make up the nervous system.
 Computer-aided engineering – broad usage of computer software to aid in engineering tasks.
 Finite element analysis – numerical technique for finding approximate solutions of partial differential equations (PDE) as well as integral equations.
 Computational fluid dynamics – branch of fluid mechanics that uses numerical methods and algorithms to solve and analyze problems that involve fluid flows.
 Computational economics – research discipline at the interface between computer science and economic and management science
 Computational sociology – branch of sociology that uses computationally intensive methods to analyze and model social phenomena.
 Computational finance – cross-disciplinary field which relies on computational intelligence, mathematical finance, numerical methods and computer simulations to make trading, hedging and investment decisions, as well as facilitating the risk management of those decisions
 Humanities computing (Digital Humanities) – area of research, teaching, and creation concerned with the intersection of computing and the disciplines of the humanities
 Information systems – study of complementary networks of hardware and software that people and organizations use to collect, filter, process, create, and distribute data
 Business informatics – discipline combining information technology (IT), informatics and management concepts.
 Information technology –
 Management information systems – provides information that is needed to manage organizations efficiently and effectively
 Health informatics – discipline at the intersection of information science, computer science, and health care.

See also 

 Outline of academic disciplines
 Outline of science
 Outline of applied science
 Outline of formal science
 Outline of social science
 Outline of natural science
 Outline of life science
 Outline of physical science
 Outline of earth science

External links 

 2010 Mathematics Subject Classification

Formal sciences
Formal science
Formal science